Rushmore and Conholt Downs is a  biological Site of Special Scientific Interest north of Andover in Hampshire. It is a Nature Conservation Review site, Grade I. 

These chalk downs have areas of grassland and scrub. There is also woodland, which is dominated by oak and ash with hazel coppice.

References

 
Sites of Special Scientific Interest in Hampshire
Nature Conservation Review sites